Lovers on a Tightrope (French: La corde raide) is a 1960 French drama film directed by Jean-Charles Dudrumet and starring Annie Girardot, François Périer and Gérard Buhr.

The film's sets were designed by the art director Olivier Girard.

Synopsis
A wealthy Paris businessman suspecting that his wife is having an affair with a garage mechanic, hired as private detective to investigate them.

Cast
 Annie Girardot as Cora
 François Périer as Daniel
 Geneviève Brunet as Isabelle
 Gérard Buhr as Henri
 Christine Caron as L'infirmière
 Marcelle Arnold as La standardiste
 Annie Andrel as La dame du vestaire
 Piella Sorano as 	Maria
 Hubert Deschamps as Carconi
 Pierre Moncorbier as Le détective
 Lucien Raimbourg as Le portier de l'hôpital
 Michel Seldow as L'homme aux lunettes
 Henri Virlojeux as Le garçon d'étage 
 Léonce Corne as Le curé
 Roger Saget as Edouard
 Louis Bugette as Un gendarme 
 Paul Bisciglia as Le mécano
 Christian Lude as Le journaliste
 Gérard Darrieu as Un gendarme
 Christian Brocard as Le pompiste
 Doudou Babet as Le veilleur de nuit
 Georges Descrières as Simon
 Henri Crémieux as Le médecin

References

Bibliography 
 Dayna Oscherwitz & MaryEllen Higgins. The A to Z of French Cinema. Scarecrow Press, 2009.

External links 
 

1960 films
1960 drama films
French drama films
1960s French-language films
Films directed by Jean-Charles Dudrumet
Films with screenplays by Roland Laudenbach
1960s French films